Minuscule 581 (in the Gregory-Aland numbering), ε 426 (von Soden), is a Greek minuscule manuscript of the New Testament, on parchment. Palaeographically it has been assigned to the 14th century. The manuscript has complex contents. It was labeled by Scrivener as 450.

Description 

The codex contains a complete text of the four Gospels on 237 parchment leaves (size ). It is written in one column per page, 21-29 lines per page.

Text 

The Greek text of the codex is a mixture of text-types with a predominate the Byzantine element. According to Hermann von Soden it is close to the textual family Π. Aland did not place it in any Category. According to the Claremont Profile Method it represents the textual family Πa in Luke 1 and Luke 20. In Luke 10 no profile was made. It creates textual cluster with the codex Minuscule 2404.

In the Pericope Adultera, Tommy Wasserman found Family Π to include 581, 1272, 1306, 1571, 1627, 1690, 1699, and 2463.

History 

The manuscript was examined by Dean Burgon. It was added to the list of New Testament manuscripts by Frederick Henry Ambrose Scrivener.

The manuscript currently housed in at the Biblioteca Comunale Ariostea (CI. II, 119), at Ferrara.

See also 

 List of New Testament minuscules
 Biblical manuscript
 Textual criticism

References

Further reading 

 

Greek New Testament minuscules
14th-century biblical manuscripts